Creasy Airport  is an airport located in unincorporated Galveston County, Texas, United States. The airport is located southwest of Santa Fe and west of Hitchcock.

The airport is privately owned by William K. Creasy. The airport is for private use.

References

External links 

Airports in Greater Houston
Buildings and structures in Galveston County, Texas
Transportation in Galveston County, Texas